The 2018–19 Wake Forest Demon Deacons women's basketball team represents Wake Forest University during the 2018–19 NCAA Division I women's basketball season. The Demon Deacons, led by seventh year head coach Jen Hoover, were members of the Atlantic Coast Conference and play their home games at the Lawrence Joel Veterans Memorial Coliseum. They finished the season 10–20, 1–15 in ACC play in last place. They lost in the first round of the ACC women's tournament to Virginia Tech.

Previous season
They finished the season 14–17, 5–11 in ACC play in eleventh place. They defeat Pittsburgh in the first round before losing in the second round of the ACC women's tournament to Miami (FL).  The Demon Deacons were not invited to a post-season tournament.

Off-season

Recruiting Class

Source:

Roster

Schedule

Source:

|-
!colspan=9 style=| Non-conference regular season

|-
!colspan=9 style=| ACC regular season

|-
!colspan=9 style=| ACC Women's Tournament

See also
 2018–19 Wake Forest Demon Deacons men's basketball team

References

Wake Forest Demon Deacons women's basketball seasons
Wake Forest